Dzhemal Noyevich Kherhadze (2 February 1945 – 11 March 2019) was a Soviet Georgian football player and coach.

He was most notable as the co-top scorer of the 1969 Soviet Top League with 16 goals. He was not awarded the top scorer prize as the Trud newspaper which was awarding said prize suspected that the last game of the season, in which he scored a hat-trick to catch up to Nikolai Osyanin on the scorers list, was fixed (his team FC Torpedo Kutaisi played FC SKA Rostov-on-Don with a score of 3-3, SKA's Vladimir Proskurin, who also scored a hat-trick to catch up with Osyanin, was not awarded the prize either). Formally the decision was justified by Osyanin scoring in "more important" games.

References

External links
 

1945 births
2019 deaths
Sportspeople from Kutaisi
Soviet footballers
Footballers from Georgia (country)
Soviet Top League players
FC Torpedo Kutaisi players
Soviet football managers
Football managers from Georgia (country)
FC Torpedo Kutaisi managers
Association football forwards